Viscount Mountgarret is a title in the Peerage of Ireland.

The title was created in 1550 for the Hon. Richard Butler, younger son of Piers Butler, 8th Earl of Ormond. 
Butler had largely rebuilt the tower house at Mountgarret in County Wexford.
His grandson, the third Viscount, was outlawed and excepted from pardon in 1652, one year after his death. His son, the fourth Viscount, received a pardon for all treasons and rebellions from King Charles II and was restored to his estates.

He was succeeded by his son, the fifth Viscount who was a supporter of King James II and led the siege of Derry in 1688 to 1689. Lord Mountgarret was taken prisoner and outlawed, with his estates forfeited. However, in 1715 the outlawry was reversed and in 1721 he claimed his seat in the Irish House of Lords.

His great-grandson, the eleventh Viscount, represented County Kilkenny in the Irish House of Commons. He was succeeded by his son, the twelfth Viscount. He was made Earl of Kilkenny in the Peerage of Ireland in 1793. The earldom technically became extinct on his death in 1846, when he was succeeded in the viscountcy by his nephew, the thirteenth Viscount.

Despite the official title version, members of the Butler family have been known to refer to themselves as the rightful heirs to both the earldom and dukedom of Kilkenny. His son, the fourteenth Viscount, assumed in 1891 by Royal licence the surname of Rawson-Butler and the arms of Rawson (which were those of his maternal grandfather) when he inherited the Nidd Hall estate but in 1902 he resumed by Royal licence the surname of Butler only. In 1911 he was created Baron Mountgarret, of Nidd in the West Riding of the County of York, in the Peerage of the United Kingdom.  the titles are held by his great-great-grandson, the eighteenth Viscount, who succeeded his father in 2004. He is understood to be the likely heir to the ancient earldom of Ormond (created in 1328) as well as to the 16th century earldom of Ossory, but has not successfully proven the claim.

The family seat is Stainley House, near Harrogate, North Yorkshire. The ancestral family home was Nidd Hall, also near Harrogate,

Viscounts Mountgarret (created 1550)
Richard Butler, 1st Viscount Mountgarret (1500–1571)
Edmund Butler, 2nd Viscount Mountgarret (died 1602)
Richard Butler, 3rd Viscount Mountgarret (1578–1651)
Edmund Butler, 4th Viscount Mountgarret (1595–1679)
Richard Butler, 5th Viscount Mountgarret (died 1706)
Edmund Butler, 6th Viscount Mountgarret (1663–1735)
Richard Butler, 7th Viscount Mountgarret (1685–1736)
James Butler, 8th Viscount Mountgarret (1686–1749)
Edmund Butler, 9th Viscount Mountgarret (1687–1751)
Edmund Butler, 10th Viscount Mountgarret (died 1779)
Edmund Butler, 11th Viscount Mountgarret (1745–1793)
Edmund Butler, 12th Viscount Mountgarret (1771–1846) (created Earl of Kilkenny in 1793)

Earls of Kilkenny (1793)
Edmund Butler, 1st Earl of Kilkenny, 12th Viscount Mountgarret (1771–1846)

Viscounts Mountgarret (reverted)
Henry Edmund Butler, 13th Viscount Mountgarret (1816–1900)
Henry Edmund Butler, 14th Viscount Mountgarret (1844–1912)
Edmund Somerset Butler, 15th Viscount Mountgarret (1875–1918)
Piers Henry Augustine Butler, 16th Viscount Mountgarret (1903–1966)
Richard Henry Piers Butler, 17th Viscount Mountgarret (1936–2004)
Piers James Richard Butler, 18th Viscount Mountgarret (b. 1961)

The heir apparent is the present holder's son, the Hon. Theo Oliver Stafford Butler (b. 2015).

See also
 Irish nobility
 Butler dynasty

Notes

References
 Kidd, Charles, Williamson, David (editors). Debrett's Peerage and Baronetage (1990 edition). New York: St Martin's Press, 1990, 
 Mosley, Charles (editor). Burke's Peerage, Baronetage & Knightage, 107th edition, 3 volumes. Wilmington, Delaware, U.S.A.: Burke's Peerage (Genealogical Books) Ltd, 2003.

Viscountcies in the Peerage of Ireland
Noble titles created in 1550
Butler dynasty